No. 111 Helicopter Unit (Snow Tigers) is a Helicopter Unit and is equipped with HAL Dhruv MKIII and based at Bareilly Air Force Station.

History
The unit created a world record for the highest landing by a HAL Cheetah helicopter at an altitude of 23,250 ft.

On 8 February 2012, this Helicopter Unit was re-equipped with the latest HAL Dhruv MKIII.

Assignments
Indo-Pakistani War of 1965
Indo-Pakistani War of 1971

Aircraft
Mil Mi-4
HAL Chetak
HAL Cheetah
HAL Dhruv MKIII

References

111